Whitley Castle (Epiacum) is a large, unusually shaped Roman fort north-west of the town of Alston, Cumbria, England. The castrum, which was first built by the Roman Army early in the 2nd century AD, was partly demolished and rebuilt around 200 AD. It appears to have been sited to protect lead mining in the area as well as to support the border defences of Hadrian's Wall.

Unlike most Roman forts that have a "playing-card shape" (rectangular with rounded corners), Whitley Castle is lozenge-shaped to fit the site. Numerous banks and ditches ring the stone ramparts, making it among the most complex defensive earthworks of any fort known in the Roman Empire.

The site was surveyed by the geologist Thomas Sopwith in the 19th century and the historian R.G. Collingwood in the 20th century. In 2012, a geophysics survey was conducted by a team from Durham University but it has not been fully excavated. Among finds at the fort are altars with inscriptions to Hercules by Legio VI Victrix (normally stationed at Eboracum [York]) and to Apollo by the 2nd Cohort of Nervians, the garrison of auxiliaries. Other finds include a midden containing shoes; coins, fragments of Samian pottery, beads, nails, and a bronze handle shaped like a dolphin.

Toponym
Although its English name is Whitley Castle, the Romans knew the fort as Epiacum. It is named in Ptolemy's Geography as the first town in the lands of Brigantes tribe in northeastern England. Its Latin name probably comes from  a local British name *Epiakon "the property, or estate of Epios", Latinised as Eppius; hence Eppius may have been a local leader or chieftain of the Brigantes tribe. The name may be a derivative of the P-Celtic epos "horse".

Location

It lies to the west of the modern A689 road beside the Pennine Way long-distance footpath. The Maiden Way road connected Whitley Castle to the fort of Magnae (Carvoran) on Hadrian's Wall to the north, and the fort of Bravoniacum (Kirkby Thore) on the Carlisle-York road to the south.

Whitley Castle is one of the most isolated Roman sites in Britain, which may help to explain both why it remains largely unexcavated as of 2018 and why so much of it has survived. The site is a lozenge-shaped spur of high ground on Castle Nook hill farm, under permanent pasture for sheep. The fort remains lie under the grass, and are most clearly seen in aerial photographs.

The fort may have been sited to exert control over the area near Alston and its lead mines, as well as to provide support for Hadrian's Wall.

History

Epiacum was built early in the 2nd century AD. It was at least partly demolished and rebuilt around AD200; the destruction coincides with an uprising of the northern tribes in 196. The fort was modified or wholly rebuilt about the year 300. It appears to have been preceded by an Iron Age fort, followed by a Roman camp before the permanent fort was constructed.

Epiacum was in some ways a typical Roman fort: inside the wall were straight roads which crossed, a headquarters building (the Praetorium), the commandant's house, a set of barrack blocks for the cohort of auxiliary soldiers, and granaries to store food. Also as usual, there was a bath house and a temple (dedicated by the auxiliaries to the Emperor Caracalla) outside the wall. There was an altar to Mithras and another, as already mentioned, to Hercules.

Epiacum, however, has two unique features. First, the fort's military engineers modified the usual rectangular plan to suit the available site: it is distorted into a lozenge or parallelogram; the internal features of the fort are similarly distorted. Second, the wall is surrounded by four steep defensive ditches and banks around the hill spur, and seven such ramparts across the uphill side of the spur. These constitute the most complex defensive earthworks of any known Roman fort, with multiple banks and ditches outside the usual stone ramparts.

Inscriptions on some of the altars found at Epiacum provide evidence of the Roman army units garrisoning the fort. One of these is inscribed "DEO HERCVLI C VITELLIVS ATTICIANVS > LEG VI V P F" ("To the god Hercules, Gaius Vitellius Atticianus, Centurion of the Legio VI Victrix, Loyal and Faithful, [erected this].") This was a regular army legion based at York.

Another altar is inscribed "DEO APOLLINI G...IVS ... ...COH II NER ..." ("To the god Apollo, Gaius Julius Marcius, [commander] of the 2nd Cohort of Nervians, [fulfilled his vow]."). This and two other inscriptions also naming the 2nd Nervians, auxiliaries from the lower Rhine, date to 213–221 AD. The altar was in a socket of a big stone slab supported by four columns, each topped by a coin; one of these was dated to 141–161 AD.

Archaeology

Little archaeological research has taken place at Whitley Castle. In 1810, the Revd. John Hodgson excavated the bath house, in the north-east corner of Epiacum. In 1825 several leather shoes were recovered from a Roman rubbish tip when a Mr Henderson was cutting a drainage ditch. The geologist Thomas Sopwith surveyed the fort, describing it, its baths and the midden (waste heap) in 1833 as follows:

The fort was surveyed by R.G. Collingwood and described by him in his Archaeology of Roman Britain, 1930, where he noted the fort's uniquely skewed shape and extraordinary set of defensive ramparts on the western, uphill side. Pottery excavated in the 1950s suggested that the fort was constructed in 122 AD, at the same time as Hadrian's Wall. A survey in 2007–8 by English Heritage showed a large Roman civilian settlement or vicus to the north and west of the fort. Artefacts found include coins, pottery, glass, objects made of jet, and inscribed stones. In 2012, the University of Durham carried out a geophysics survey. In the absence of a full excavation, archaeologists have exploited the diggings of moles to uncover Roman artefacts by sifting earth thrown up by the animals in their molehills. Finds include fragments of terra sigillata (Samian ware, Roman table pottery); rim fragments of serving bowls and earthenware pots; a bead made of jet; some iron nails; and a bronze dolphin from the bath house, most likely the handle of an instrument like a strigil or razor.

Conservation and access

The site is on the privately owned Castle Nook Farm, and is a Scheduled Ancient Monument. In 2012 the not-for-profit company Epiacum Heritage Ltd. secured a grant of £49,200 from the Heritage Lottery Fund to develop a programme of events for the fort to include a website, guided tours for the public, archaeology survey days for volunteers and educational events for schools.
Epiacum Heritage and Castle Nook Farm later received a grant from a DEFRA-funded "Farming in Protected Landscapes" programme to fund a new visitor trail and enhanced interpretation. The new permissive access route starts at the South Tyne Trail.

The Roman fort can be visited for free during daylight hours. There is a new car park and café below the fort on the west side of the A689 road. Visitors should note that the large sign for the site reads 'Epiacum' and not 'Whitley Castle'.

Notes

References

Sources

External links
 Cybermoor: Alston Moor, Cumbria
 Geograph: Whitley Castle Roman Fort (photographs)
 Roman Britain: Epiacum 
 Epiacum Heritage  (official website)

Roman sites in Northumberland
Roman fortifications